Juan Artola Letamendía (29 November 1895 – 1937) was a Spanish footballer who played as a midfielder. He was a member of the Spanish team which won the silver medal in the football tournament.

Club career
Born in San Sebastián, he began his career at the youth football club Deportiva Esperanza, before reaching the first team of Real Sociedad team in 1913, where he remained until 1915. In his first season with the club, he helped them reach the 1913 Copa del Rey Final (UECF), where they found themselves trailing 1-2 with seconds to go, but Artola scored a last-minute equalizer that forced a replay that also ended in a draw before finally being beaten 1-2 by Barcelona FC.

International career
He represented the Spain national team at the 1920 Summer Olympics, featuring in two games against Belgium and Italy as Spain won the silver medal.

Being a Real Sociedad player, he was eligible to play for the Basque Country national team, and he was a member of the team that won the first edition of the Prince of Asturias Cup in 1915, an inter-regional competition organized by the RFEF. Artola was a starter in both games against Catalonia and Centro (a Castile/Madrid XI), helping his side to assure the competition's first-ever title.

Honours

Club
Real Sociedad
Copa del Rey:
Runner-up (1) 1913

International
Spain
Olympic Games Silver medal: 1920

Norte
Prince of Asturias Cup:
Champions (1): 1915

Notes

References

External links
 
 
 

1895 births
1937 deaths
Spanish footballers
Spain international footballers
Footballers at the 1920 Summer Olympics
Olympic footballers of Spain
Olympic silver medalists for Spain
Real Sociedad footballers
Real Madrid CF players
Real Betis players
Sevilla FC players
Olympic medalists in football
Medalists at the 1920 Summer Olympics
Footballers from San Sebastián
Association football midfielders
Basque Country international footballers
Spanish casualties of the Spanish Civil War